Jawai Bandh railway station is located near Jawai Dam of Pali district in Rajasthan. It serves Jawai Dam area. It has two platforms. Its code is JWB. Express and Superfast trains halt here.

Trains

 Suryanagri Express
 Dadar–Ajmer Superfast Express
 Ranakpur Express
 Amrapur Aravali Express
 Yoga Express
 Bandra Terminus–Jaisalmer Superfast Express
 Bandra Terminus–Bikaner Superfast Express
 Okha–Jaipur Weekly Express
 Jodhpur–Bangalore City Express (via Hubballi)

References

Railway stations in Pali district
Ajmer railway division